Nika Križnar (born 9 March 2000) is a Slovenian ski jumper.

Career
In the 2020–21 World Cup season, she won the overall title after finishing nine points above Sara Takanashi. At the 2022 Winter Olympics, she won bronze in the women's normal hill individual event.

Major tournament results

Winter Olympics

FIS Nordic World Ski Championships

World Cup

Standings

Individual wins

Individual starts

References

External links

2000 births
Living people
People from Škofja Loka
Slovenian female ski jumpers
Olympic ski jumpers of Slovenia
Ski jumpers at the 2018 Winter Olympics
Ski jumpers at the 2022 Winter Olympics
Medalists at the 2022 Winter Olympics
Olympic gold medalists for Slovenia
Olympic bronze medalists for Slovenia
Olympic medalists in ski jumping
FIS Nordic World Ski Championships medalists in ski jumping
21st-century Slovenian women